George Leonard Simpson (3 December 1933 – 23 February 2012) was an English professional footballer who played in the Football League for Gillingham and Mansfield Town.

References

1933 births
2012 deaths
People from Shirebrook
Footballers from Derbyshire
English footballers
Association football inside forwards
English Football League players
Hereford United F.C. players
Mansfield Town F.C. players
Gillingham F.C. players
Oxford United F.C. players